Ayoub El Kaabi (born 25 June 1993) is a Moroccan professional footballer who plays as a forward or winger for Hatayspor and the Morocco national team. He started his professional career playing for Racing de Casablanca.

A full international for Morocco since 2018, El Kaabi represented the nation at the 2018 FIFA World Cup, one Africa Cup of Nations tournament and two African Nations Championship tournaments.

El Kaabi was the top goalscorer of the 2018 African Nations Championship, taking place on home soil, with nine goals. This made him the first player to reach that tally in a single competition, having surpassed the previous record set by Zambia's Given Singuluma of five goals in 2009. After netting a brace in the semi-final against Libya, Morocco made it to the final of the competition for the first time in history.

Early life
Ayoub Al Kaabi was born on June 26, 1993, in Casablanca and was playing football among the neighborhoods of Al-Bayda.

When asked when he knew he would become a professional, the footballer said that he made his decision at the age of 16.
“It was difficult at first, I was doing odd jobs next door. I even sold salt, but a player coach Youness called me, and asked me to focus solely on football to achieve my goals.

Club career

Racing de Casablanca
He was loaned by one of the clubs practicing in the Third National Division, to play the large number of matches where he gained experience. He started his professional career playing in the first team of Racing Athlétique Club. He started his career as a left-back due to his speed and stamina ability, he later joined the first team and changed his position from full-back to the center of a defensive field, and then settled in the attacking position, after the coach saw his great finishing ability. He was credited with ascending the Racing Club to the First National Division.

Renaissance Sportive de Berkane
El Kaabi joined RS Berkane as a transfer from Racing de Casablanca during summer 2017. He was the top scorer in the Botola 2 during the 2016–17 season with 25 goals. El kaabi won the 2018 Moroccan Throne Cup after defeating Wydad de Fès in the finals by penalties.

Hebei F.C.
In 2018, El Kaabi was purchased by Hebei China Fortune for a transfer fee of €6.5 million.

On 2 August, El kaabi scored his first goal for the club after scoring a volley against Beijing Guoan.

On March 30, El Kaabi managed to score his third goal of the season against the formidable defense of Shanghai SIPG, though he could not prevent his team from losing the game (1-2). With his efforts, the Moroccan player has won the hearts and minds of the Hebei public, and established himself as a rising star alongside his teammates Argentinians Ezequiel Lavezzi and Javier Mascherano.

Wydad Athletic Club
In July 2019, El Kaabi joined Wydad AC on a six-month loan.

In September 2020, he returned to Wydad AC as a free agent. He took part in the qualifying stages of the 2019–20 CAF Champions League before signing to the turkish side Hatayspor. During the competition El Kaabi managed to score a hat-trick against Atlético Petróleos de Luanda marking his final match for Wydad. He finished as the top scorer of the Botola in the 2020–21 season with 18 goals.

Hatayspor 
In 2021, El Kaabi signed a 2-year contract until June 2023 with Hatayspor, after having made the heyday of Wydad in Casablanca.

On 23 August 2021, El Kabbi made his debut for the team, after being substituted in 76th minute for Mame Diouf against Galatasaray, the game ended in a 2–1 loss. On 28 August he scored his first goal with the team after a 5–0 victory against Alanyaspor. On 27 February 2022, El Kaabi scored his first hat-trick for the club in a 5–2 win against Yeni Malatyaspor. Due to the 2023 Turkey–Syria earthquake, the club withdrew from the league after the club's quarters in Antakya collapsed. This forced El Kaabi to search for another club.

Al Sadd SC 
On 1 March 2023, Qatari club Al Sadd SC reached an agreement with El Kaabi to join the club until the end of the current season. On 7 March 2023, El Kaabi scored his first goal in his second appearance for the club.

International career
El Kaabi made his international debut for the Morocco national team on 13 January 2018 in a 2018 Africa Nations Championship group stage match against Mauritania, scoring two goals. The footballer was named Man of The Match on January 31 after Morocco's match against Libya during CHAN's semi-final match. Morocco won the game 3-1. Morocco was set to face Nigeria in the finals. On 4 February 2018, Morocco defeated Nigeria 4-0, El Kaabi scored a goal in the 73rd minute of the match. The Confederation of African Football (CAF) chose El Kaabi as the best player of the tournament due to the world-class performance and pure talent he displayed throughout the entire tournament scoring 9 goals in 5 matches, making him the top goal scorer in the entire history of the competition.

El Kaabi scored his first international hat trick on 17 January 2018 against Guinea.

In May 2018 he was named in Morocco's 23-man squad for the 2018 FIFA World Cup in Russia. He played only 2 matches out of the 3 in the World cup, played the first match as the starting 11 against Iran and coming on the 69th minute as substitute for Khalid Boutaib against Portugal.

EL Kaabi represented Morocco in the 2020 African Nations Championship, scoring a total of three goals which helped his country to achieve the title and becoming the first and only country to win the Championship back to back. His most appreciated goal is the goal he scored in the final against Mali in the 79th minute that guaranteed them the win.

After his performances with the Moroccan A' for two years achieving two African titles, the newly Bosnian Coach Vahid Halilhodžić was impressed and decided to call him to represent Morocco national team for the 2022 FIFA World Cup qualification (CAF). In his first six matches with the team, he managed to score five goals allowing him to become the Moroccan top goalscorer; and surpassing the second round qualification with ease.

Playing style
El Kaabi is a strong built attacker who likes to cut in the penalty box area with an excellent finishing.

Personal life
On 9 January 2022, El Kaabi tested positive for COVID-19 alongside his teammate Ryan Mmaee.

Career statistics

Club

International

Scores and results list Morocco's goal tally first, score column indicates score after each El Kaabi goal.

Honours
RS Berkane
 Moroccan Throne Cup: 2018

Wydad AC
 Botola: 2020–21

Morocco
 African Nations Championship: 2018, 2020

Individual
 RSB Player of the Season: 2018
 African Nations Championship Best Player: 2018
 African Nations Championship Top Scorer: 2018 (9 goals)
 African Nations Championship Team of the Tournament: 2018, 2020
 Botola Top Scorer: 2020–21 (18 goals)
 Botola 2 top scorer: 2016-2017 (25 goals)

Record
 Morocco A all-time top goalscorer
 Top scorer in a single CHAN edition.
Current top scorer of CHAN.
 First Player To Hit Double Digits In CHAN History.

References

External links

1993 births
Living people
Moroccan footballers
Footballers from Casablanca
Racing de Casablanca players
RS Berkane players
Wydad AC players
Botola players
Hebei F.C. players
Hatayspor footballers
Chinese Super League players
Süper Lig players
Morocco international footballers
Expatriate footballers in China
Expatriate footballers in Turkey
Moroccan expatriate sportspeople in China
Moroccan expatriate sportspeople in Turkey
Association football forwards
2018 FIFA World Cup players
2020 African Nations Championship players
2021 Africa Cup of Nations players
2018 African Nations Championship players
Morocco A' international footballers